Mesovouni is a village in the Karditsa regional unit in Thessaly, Greece. It is part of the municipality Argithea.

Populated places in Karditsa (regional unit)